Marin Gradac is a Bosnian musician who is a trombonist for the Sarajevo Philharmonic Orchestra. Formerly, he was a member of a Bosnian garage rock band Zabranjeno Pušenje.

Career 
In 1996, Gradac accompanied Sejo Sexon and Elvis J. Kurtović, with whom he restarted the band Zabranjeno Pušenje, disbanded in the early 1990s. He sang and performed on two studio albums; Fildžan viška (1997) and Agent tajne sile (1999). Also, Gradac performed on their first live album; Hapsi sve! (1998). According to Sejo Sexon, Gradac was a really good singer, but the fans didn't accept him, especially the core ones. Gradac left Zabranjeno Pušenje in 2000 due to other commitments; he went to complete the Sarajevo Music Academy.

Gradac has been playing a trombone for the Sarajevo Philharmonic Orchestra.

Gradas is a executive producer of the Sarajevo Big Band and a board member of the Saraj Pro-Brass Musicians Association.

Discography 

Zabranjeno pušenje
 Fildžan viška (1996)
 Hapsi sve! (1998)
 Agent tajne sile (1999)

References

External links
 Discography on Discogs

Year of birth missing (living people)
Living people
Bosnia and Herzegovina rock musicians
Bosnia and Herzegovina rock singers
Bosnia and Herzegovina record producers
Classical trombonists
Male trombonists
University of Sarajevo alumni
Zabranjeno pušenje members
Yugoslav classical musicians
20th-century classical trombonists
21st-century classical trombonists